Daniel Michael Tellep (20 November 1931 – 26 November 2020) was an American aerospace businessman. He died on November 26, 2020. He served as CEO and chairman of the board of the Lockheed Corporation from 1989 to 1995 and CEO of Lockheed Martin Corporation in 1996. 
Mr. Tellep joined Lockheed in 1955 and served as President of Lockheed Missiles & Space Company Inc., a wholly owned subsidiary of Lockheed, from 1984 to 1988. He served as group president-missiles and space systems from 1986 to 1988. Mr. Tellep served as chairman of the board of Lockheed Martin Corporation (Aerospace Industry) until 1996. Mr. Tellep served as Director of Wells Fargo Bank National Association of WFC Holdings Corporation and has been its Director since 1996. He served as Director of First Interstate Bancorp since 1991. He served as a Director of Edison International, Scecorp and Southern California Edison Company, a subsidiary of Edison International since 1992. Mr. Tellep held two degrees from the University of California, Berkeley (B.S. in Mechanical Engineering in 1954 and M.S. in 1955) and has completed studies at Harvard Business School.

In 1979, Tellep was elected to the National Academy of Engineering for his "Pioneering theoretical, experimental, and design contributions in the development of re-entry systems for U.S. Fleet Ballistic Missiles."

It was Tellep who, in 1994, proposed the merger which resulted in the formation of Lockheed Martin.

References

Additional sources 

Tellep, Daniel Michael
2020 deaths
American chief executives
Lockheed people
Members of the United States National Academy of Engineering
Harvard Business School alumni

20th-century American businesspeople
UC Berkeley College of Engineering alumni